Margrét Erla Maack (born 24 April 1991) is an Icelandic entertainer and television host. She has worked on the TV programs Gettu betur, Kastljós and Ísland í dag.

Personal life
Margrét dated Tómas Steindórsson from 2017 to 2023. In 2019, they had their first child together.

References

External links
Official website

1984 births
Living people
Margret Erla Maack